Mark Patrick Pederson (born January 14, 1968) is a Canadian ice hockey coach and former professional ice hockey left winger who played 169 games in the NHL. He is currently serving as head coach of German side Augsburger Panther since 2021.

Pederson was born in Prelate, Saskatchewan, but grew up in Medicine Hat, Alberta.

Playing career
Pederson was drafted 15th overall by the Canadiens in the 1986 NHL Entry Draft. He spent played five seasons in the National Hockey League (NHL) for the Montreal Canadiens, Philadelphia Flyers, San Jose Sharks and Detroit Red Wings from 1989–90 until 1993–94. He saw action in a total of 169 NHL games, scoring 35 goals and 50 assists for 85 points.

In 1995, he took his game overseas and signed with Austrian side Villacher SV. In the following season (1996–97), he played for Färjestad BK in Sweden, before transferring to Zürcher SC of Switzerland. From 1997 to 2002, Pederson spent time in Germany, representing DEL teams Hannover Scorpions, Krefeld Pinguine and Adler Mannheim and won the German championship with the Adler squad in 2001. Pederson joined the San Diego Gulls in 2002 and had a three-year stint with the team. In the 2002-03 season, he led the Gulls to winning the Taylor Cup, while being named Playoff MVP and WCHL Forward of the Year. He retired following the 2004-05 season.

Coaching career 
Pederson served a four-year stint as assistant coach of ECHL's Bakersfield Condors from 2005 to 2009 and was the head coach of the Tilburg Trappers of the Dutch Eredivisie in 2009-10, while also coaching the Serbian national team. After one season he left Tilburg and went to Japan where he acted as head coach of the Nikkō Ice Bucks between 2010 and 2013.

Pederson took over the head coaching job at Esbjerg Energy prior to the 2013–14 season. After a runner-up finish in 2015, he guided the Energy to the Danish championship in 2016 and 2017.

Legal Troubles
Pederson was suspended for two weeks in 2009 for an "internal matter" while working as an assistant coach with the Bakersfield Condors, which was revealed later to be due to antisemitic comments toward then-Condor Jason Bailey. In January 2011, Pederson was named in a lawsuit filed by Bailey's lawyer, Keith Fink, alleging that his client faced "a barrage of anti-Semitic, offensive and degrading verbal attacks regarding his Jewish faith" from Pederson and head coach Marty Raymond. Pederson, in particular, was named in the suit as having approached Bailey on one occasion to state: "oh, I got a (Facebook) friend request from a dirty Jew." On January 27, ESPN.com released details of court documents filed by Fink and reported that the NHL is also now investigating. According to a report dated November 8, 2011, Bailey voluntarily filed a request to dismiss all claims of discrimination.

Career statistics

Regular season and playoffs

International

Awards
 WHL East First All-Star Team – 1987
 WHL East Second All-Star Team – 1988

References

External links
 

1968 births
Adirondack Red Wings players
Adler Mannheim players
Canadian ice hockey left wingers
Detroit Red Wings players
EC VSV players
Färjestad BK players
Hannover Scorpions players
Ice hockey people from Alberta
Ice hockey people from Saskatchewan
Kalamazoo Wings (1974–2000) players
Krefeld Pinguine players
Living people
Medicine Hat Tigers players
Montreal Canadiens draft picks
Montreal Canadiens players
National Hockey League first-round draft picks
Sportspeople from Medicine Hat
People from Rural Municipality Happyland No. 231, Saskatchewan
Philadelphia Flyers players
San Diego Gulls (ECHL) players
San Diego Gulls (WCHL) players
San Jose Sharks players
Sherbrooke Canadiens players
ZSC Lions players
Canadian expatriate ice hockey players in Austria
Canadian expatriate ice hockey players in Germany
Canadian expatriate ice hockey players in Switzerland
Canadian expatriate ice hockey players in Sweden